The Bosnia and Herzegovina national under-15 football team is made up by players who are 15 years old or younger and represents Bosnia and Herzegovina in international football matches at this age level. It is controlled by the Football Association of Bosnia and Herzegovina.

Current squad
The following players were called-up for 2022 Memorial Tournament "Vlatko Marković".
Caps and goals correct as of 15 May after 2022 Memorial Tournament "Vlatko Marković".

Recent call-ups
The following eligible players have been called up for the team within the last twelve months:

INJ Withdrawn due to injury.
PRE Preliminary squad.
SUS Suspended.
WD Withdrew.

Personnel

Current technical staff

Managers

See also 
 Bosnia and Herzegovina national football team
 Bosnia and Herzegovina national under-21 football team
 Bosnia and Herzegovina national under-19 football team
 Bosnia and Herzegovina national under-18 football team
 Bosnia and Herzegovina national under-17 football team
 Bosnia and Herzegovina national under-16 football team
 Bosnia and Herzegovina women's national football team

External links
 

European national under-15 association football teams
Bosnia and Herzegovina national youth football teams